The 2011–12 Cincinnati Bearcats men's basketball team represents the University of Cincinnati during the 2011–12 NCAA Division I men's basketball season. The team plays its home games in Cincinnati, Ohio at the Fifth Third Arena, which has a capacity of 13,176. They are members of the Big East Conference.

Offseason

Departing players

Incoming Transfers

Recruiting class of 2011

Roster

Depth chart

Source

Schedule and results

|-
!colspan=12 style=|Exhibition

|-

|-
!colspan=12 style=|Non-conference regular season

|-
!colspan=12 style=|Big East Regular Season

|-
!colspan=12 style=|Big East tournament 
   
   
  
|-
!colspan=12 style=|NCAA tournament

Rankings

Awards and milestones

Big East Conference honors

All-Big East Second Team
Sean Kilpatrick

Player of the Week
Week 7: Sean Kilpatrick
Week 9: Dion Dixon

See also
2011–12 Big East Conference men's basketball season
2011 Crosstown Shootout brawl

Notes

Cincinnati Bearcats men's basketball seasons
Cincinnati Bearcats
Cincinnati
Cincin
Cincin